The 2017 All-Ireland Senior Ladies' Football Championship Final featured  and . Dublin also played Mayo in the 2017 men's All-Ireland final. This was only the second time that the two finals featured teams representing the same two counties; the first time was in 1982, when Kerry played Offaly in both the men's and ladies' finals.

Dublin ended their losing streak in All-Ireland finals with a dominant display of attacking football against Mayo. There was some drama in the first-half when in the 24th minute the Mayo goalkeeper, Yvonne Byrne, dragged down Sinéad Aherne. The referee, Seamus Mulvihill, awarded a penalty and sin-binned Byrne. However Mayo's substitute goalkeeper, Aisling Tarpey, subsequently saved the penalty taken by Aherne. The Dublin forwards were in top form. Despite missing the penalty, Aherne went on to score nine points. Niamh McEvoy and Carla Rowe scored 1–1 each and Noëlle Healy was named player of the match. Strong performances in defence by Sinéad Goldrick and Niamh Collins limited the impact of Cora Staunton. However despite this Mayo remained in contention until the last ten minutes. Three late goals, two from substitute Sarah McCaffrey and one from Carla Rowe, eventually put the result beyond doubt.

Route to the Final

In the semi-finals,  ended 's six year reign as All-Ireland champions when they defeated Cork 3–11 to 0–18. 's route to the final was featured in a behind-the-scenes documentary, Blues Sisters, broadcast on RTÉ One on 28 November 2017.

Attendance record
The attendance of 46,286 was a record for an All-Ireland Senior Ladies' Football Championship final. It was also the best attended women's sports final of 2017. The second best attended final was the 2017 FA Women's Cup Final which had an attendance of 35,271. It was also the best attended women's sporting event in Europe during 2017. A BBC Northern Ireland report declared it was "the highest attended women's sporting event in the world in 2017", describing the 2017 Solheim Cup, which was attended by 125,000, as a "tournament...held over three days".

TV audience
In addition to breaking attendance records, the 2017 final also set a new TV audience record for TG4. An average of 303,800 people watched the final – the highest figure since the station started broadcasting women's finals in 2001. Viewing peaked at 5.24pm when 409,700 people were watching and the broadcast reached 563,000 viewers in total, accounting for 40% of the viewing public in the Republic of Ireland.

Match info

Teams

References

!
All-Ireland Senior Ladies' Football Championship Finals
All-Ireland Senior Ladies' Football Championship Final
All-Ireland Senior Ladies' Football Championship Final, 2017
Dublin county ladies' football team matches
Mayo county ladies' football team matches